Werner Bergengruen (September 16, 1892 – September 4, 1964) was a Baltic German novelist and poet. He was nominated for the Nobel Prize in Literature.

Life and career
Bergengruen was born in Riga, Governorate of Livonia, which at that time belonged to the Russian Empire. After growing up in Lübeck and attending the Katharineum, he started studying theology in Marburg in 1911. He later changed to studying Germanistics and art history, but failed to graduate; he then moved to Munich. He served as a lieutenant during World War I and joined the Baltische Landeswehr in 1919 to fight against the Bolsheviks.

On 4 October 1919, he married Charlotte Hensel (1896–1990), a descendant of the composer Fanny Mendelssohn, and the daughter of the mathematician Kurt Hensel. From the marriage there were four children, Olaf, Luise, Maria and Alexander.

Bergengruen started writing novels and short stories in 1923 and decided to become a full-time writer in 1927. While his earlier works were of a more contemplative nature and pondered metaphysical and religious questions, the Nazis' rise to power led him to write more political works. His most successful novel, Der Großtyrann und das Gericht (The Grand Tyrant and the Judgment), published in 1935, is set in the Renaissance era, but the story of a merciless tyrant playing with the weaknesses of his underlings was often seen as a clear allegory on Germany's political situation. This interpretation is doubtful, though, as most of the novel was written before the Nazi takeover in 1933. In 1936 Bergengruen was received into the Catholic Church. The same year he moved to Munich; his new neighbour was Carl Muth, editor of the Catholic monthly Hochland. Although Bergengruen was politically a staunch conservative, his Catholicism—as well as the fact that his wife was of partly Jewish heritage—contributed to his alienation from the Nazi regime.

In 1942, after his house in Munich was destroyed by bombs, Bergengruen moved to Achenkirch. After World War II, he lived in Switzerland, Rome, and finally Baden-Baden, where he died in 1964.

Books
 "Rome remembered." (Transl. German: "Römisches Erinnerungsbuch") Introduced by Clare Boothe Luce. Translated by Roland Hill. 40 color plates by Erich Lessing; 57 engravings by G. B. Piranesi. New York: Herder and Herder, 1968.
 "A Matter of Conscience." New York: Thames & Hudson, 1952. Review: Books: Morality Whodunit, TIME May 12, 1952.

References

1892 births
1964 deaths
Writers from Riga
People from Kreis Riga
Baltic-German people
German Roman Catholics
Converts to Roman Catholicism from Lutheranism
20th-century German novelists
German poets
Mendelssohn family
German Army personnel of World War I
Baltische Landeswehr personnel
Commanders Crosses of the Order of Merit of the Federal Republic of Germany
Recipients of the Pour le Mérite (civil class)
Schiller Memorial Prize winners